Club Africain Women's Volleyball Club (Arabic: النادي الافريقي للكرة الطائرة للسيدات, English:  African Club or CA) is a Tunisian women's volleyball club based in Tunis. It was formed in 1958 and is one of women's main section of Club Africain that currently plays in Tunisian Volleyball League Division A after this discipline was revived again in 2012.

Honours

National titles
 Tunisian Volleyball League 13 :
Champions : 1958–59, 1979–80, 1980–81, 1981–82, 1982–83, 1983–84, 1984–85, 1985–86, 1986–87, 1989–90, 1990–91, 1992–93, 1993–94

 Tunisian Volleyball Cup 09 :
Champions : 1958–59, 1982–83, 1983–84, 1984–85, 1986–87, 1987–88, 1988–89, 1989–90, 1990–91

International titles
 African Champions Cup 4 :
Champions : 1986, 1987, 1988, 1989

 African Cup Winners' Cup 1 :
Champions : 1992

Team

Current squad 2017–18

Notable players

 Sabiha Ben Ahmed
 Samia Ben Amara
 Aicha Ben Fejria
 Jawa Ben Zaara
 Sonia Ben Zineb
 Jalila Boubarna
 Raja Boubarna
 Azza Fridhi
 Faïza Hentati
 Jalila Hentati
 Geneviève Tremsal
 Samia Zaouch
 Hajer Wenna
 Hajer Zbiss

See also
Club Africain (football)
Club Africain (basketball)
Club Africain (handball)
Club Africain (men's volleyball)

References

External links
Official website 
Club Africian on Instagram

Tunisian volleyball clubs
Volleyball clubs established in 1958
1958 establishments in Tunisia
Sport in Tunis